Christophe Laigneau (11 January 1965 – 23 December 2011) was a French professional footballer who played as a midfielder.

Career
Born in Clichy-sous-Bois, Laigneau played for Laval, Chaumont, Maubeuge, Le Puy and Troyes.

Death
Laigneau died on 23 December 2011, at the age of 46.

References

1965 births
2011 deaths
French footballers
Stade Lavallois players
ES Troyes AC players
Ligue 1 players
Ligue 2 players
Le Puy Foot 43 Auvergne players
Association football midfielders
Footballers from Seine-Saint-Denis
People from Clichy-sous-Bois